†Fluvidona dulvertonensis was a species of minute freshwater snail with an operculum, an aquatic gastropod mollusk or micromollusk in the family Tateidae. This species was endemic to Australia but was declared extinct in 1996.

References

Angrobia
Hydrobiidae
Extinct gastropods
Taxonomy articles created by Polbot
Taxobox binomials not recognized by IUCN